Heist of the Century is the debut solo studio album by American rapper and Wu-Tang Clan affiliate La the Darkman from Grand Rapids, Michigan. It was released on November 17, 1998 through Supreme Team Entertainment. Production was handled by Carlos "Six July" Broady, 4th Disciple, Havoc of Mobb Deep, RZA, Raekwon, and DJ Muggs of Cypress Hill. It features appearances by many Wu-Tang Clan members and affiliates such as Ghostface Killah, Masta Killa and U-God among others.

Track listing

Charts

References

External links 

1998 debut albums
Albums produced by RZA
Albums produced by DJ Muggs
Albums produced by Havoc (musician)